The mixed pairs figure skating at the 1999 Asian Winter Games was held on 3 and 5 February 1999 at Yongpyong Indoor Ice Rink, South Korea.

Schedule
All times are Korea Standard Time (UTC+09:00)

Results

References

Results

External links
Schedule

Pairs